Hallow's Victim is the second studio album by the American doom metal band Saint Vitus. It was released in 1985 by SST Records. This album was the last to feature original singer Scott Reagers until their seventh album, Die Healing (1995). Reagers also appears on The Walking Dead EP that was released the same year. It remained the only Saint Vitus album not to be officially released on CD until SST officially released the album on CD in combination with The Walking Dead in 2010.

Track listing
All songs written by Dave Chandler, except where noted.

Side one
 "War Is Our Destiny" (Chandler, Scott Reagers) - 4:05
 "White Stallions" - 5:21
 "Mystic Lady" - 7:37

Side two
 "Hallow's Victim" - 2:40
 "The Sadist" (Chandler, Reagers) - 3:56
 "Just Friends (Empty Love)" (Chandler, Reagers) - 5:40
 "Prayer for the (M)Asses" - 4:45
 "Outro" - 0:27

Personnel
Saint Vitus
 Scott Reagers - vocals
 Dave Chandler - guitar
 Mark Adams - bass
 Armando Acosta - drums

Production
Joe Carducci - producer
SPOT - producer, engineer

References

1985 albums
Saint Vitus (band) albums
SST Records albums
Albums produced by Spot (producer)